Winnie Lau Siu Wai (born 24 July 1971) is a Hong Kong singer and actress. She has two daughters with her husband, Edmund So, from Grasshopper.

Discography
 Sin Of Lonely
 Showing All The Feelings
 Denon Mastersonic Series
 Unwilling To Part With
 Change Selection
 The Classical Songs of Universal
 Love Is Gone
 Thank You for Loving Me

Filmography

References
  Winnie Lau on Weibo

Winnie Lau Siu Wai at Hong Kong Cinemagic

1971 births
Living people
Cantopop singers
20th-century Hong Kong women singers
Hong Kong film actresses
Hong Kong Mandopop singers
Hong Kong television actresses
20th-century Hong Kong actresses
21st-century Hong Kong actresses